This Is Not Propaganda: Adventures in the War Against Reality is a 2019 book by Peter Pomerantsev about disinformation and propaganda, particularly in Russia.

Seve Bloomfield of The Guardian described the work as "Part memoir, part investigation, part cry for help".

The work discusses digital propaganda and how it affects viewer's senses of normality. He observed how the manipulation of reality characterizing Russian politics was used in the 2016 U.S. presidential election and in the Brexit referendum. The book includes a discussion on Rodrigo Duterte. The end of the book gives suggestions on how to build journalistic and online practices to solidify a focus on facts.

Background
Pomerantsev observed that propaganda practices in Russia began to be used in the west, spurring him to write this book.

References

Bibliography

External links 
 

2019 non-fiction books
English-language books
Faber and Faber books
Books about propaganda
Books about Russia
PublicAffairs books